Steadman is a surname of Germanic origin. It has also been used as a given name. People with the name include:

Surname
 Alison Steadman (born 1946), British actress
 Bernice Steadman (1925–2015), American aviator
 Carl Steadman (born 1970), American web entrepreneur
 Catherine Steadman (21st c.), British actress
 Charles Steadman (1790–1868), American architect
 Craig Steadman (born 1982), English professional snooker player
 David Steadman (late 20th/early 21st c.), American palaeontologist and ornithologist
 Graham Steadman (born 1961), English rugby league footballer
 Jack Steadman (1928–2015), American football executive 
 Jack Steadman (musician), British musician 
 James Steadman (born 1983), British cricketer
 James Steadman (politician) (1818–1913), Canadian lawyer, legislator, and judge
 Jan Steadman (born 1947), Trinidadian footballer
 John Steadman (1927–2001), American sportswriter
 John Steadman (actor) (1909–1993), American actor
 Joseph Steadman (1878–1944), English footballer
 Kelley Steadman (born 1990), American hockey player
 Ken Steadman (1969–1996), American television actor
 Oli Steadman (born 1987), British-South African musician
 Pat Steadman (born 1964), American legislator
 Ralph Steadman (born 1936), British cartoonist
 Ray Steadman-Allen (1922–2014), British Salvation Army officer and composer
 Richard Steadman (born 1937), American knee surgeon
 Robert Steadman (born 1965), British composer
 Royal Charles Steadman (1875–1964), American botanical artist
 Vera Steadman (1900–1966), American film actress
 W. C. Steadman (1851–1911), British trade unionist politician

Given name
 Steadman Marlin (born 1980), NASCAR driver
 Steadman Vincent Sanford (1871–1945), president of the University of Georgia
 Steadman S. Shealy (born 1958), American attorney and football player
 Steadman Upham (born 1949), president of the University of Tulsa

See also
Stedman (surname)